It Won/t Be Like This All the Time Live (stylized in all caps) is a live concert album by Scottish indie rock band The Twilight Sad, released via Bandcamp by Rock Action Records on 16 April 2020, and via other streaming platforms on 15 May 2020.  The album was recorded on the band's short UK tour of November 2019 to promote their album It Won/t Be Like This All the Time, which was released to universally positive reviews in January 2019.

Background
In November 2019 the band played a short UK tour of larger venues, at London's Kentish Town Forum, Manchester's O2 Ritz and Edinburgh's Usher Hall, the shows being professionally recorded. Singer James Graham said, "We have been talking about recording a live album for a long time. We think this is the best we've been playing as a live band and wanted to document that." In 2020, two shows were planned in quadrophonic sound at Glasgow's Barrowland Ballroom, but were eventually postponed due to the coronavirus pandemic.

Instead, on what would have been the day of the first show, the band released It Won/t Be Like This All the Time Live for download via Bandcamp on a "pay-what-you-like" basis. Graham commented, "Over the past few months we were figuring out how to release the album and then COVID-19/lockdown/gig cancellations happened. We quickly decided that we would release the album digitally on a pay what you want basis. The reason behind this is that we know that financially it is a worrying time for a lot of people and for ourselves included. We wanted to make sure we could give everyone who likes our band one of our gigs live in their living room as we can't be out in the world playing gigs right now".

On 17 April, the night of the second Glasgow show, fans were invited to take part in a listening party on Twitter, hosted by Tim Burgess, singer of The Charlatans. Graham said, "...we were supposed to be playing our second night at the famous Glasgow Barrowland Ballroom ... Let's pretend we're all at the gig together. All five of us will be taking part and sharing memories from past gigs, sharing thoughts on playing live and many other things."

Track listing

Personnel
Musicians
James Alexander Graham – vocals
Andy MacFarlane – guitars
Jonathan Docherty – bass
Brendan Smith – keyboards
Sebastien Schultz – drums

Production
Andy MacFarlane – producer
Michael Brennan – mixing

Release history

Notes

References

2020 albums
The Twilight Sad albums
Rock Action Records albums